Regbio klubas Ąžuolas are an amateur rugby club based in Kaunas, Lithuania, founded in 1989.

In 2015 it became the rugby section for the primarily basketball club Žalgiris Kaunas, adapting the name Regbio klubas Žalgiris. The partnership fell apart in 2019, and the rugby club was renamed back to RK Ąžuolas.

External links
Official website

References

Lithuanian rugby union teams
Sport in Kaunas